Jinkan Ifraimu Bulus (born 13 December 1988) is a Nigerian badminton player.

Achievements

All African  Games 
Men's singles

Men's doubles

African Championships 
Men's singles

Men's doubles

BWF International Challenge/Series 
Men's singles

Men's doubles

Mixed doubles

  BWF International Challenge tournament
  BWF International Series tournament
  BWF Future Series tournament

References

External links 
 

Living people
1988 births
Nigerian male badminton players
Badminton players at the 2010 Commonwealth Games
Commonwealth Games competitors for Nigeria
Competitors at the 2007 All-Africa Games
Competitors at the 2011 All-Africa Games
Competitors at the 2015 African Games
African Games gold medalists for Nigeria
African Games bronze medalists for Nigeria
African Games medalists in badminton
21st-century Nigerian people